Tom Myers is an American sound engineer. He has been nominated for 3 Academy Awards; one for Best Sound Mixing and two for Best Sound Editing. He has worked on more than 100 films since 1990.

Selected filmography
 Mission: Impossible (1996)
 Geri's Game (1997)
 Grandia (1997)
 Quest for Camelot (1998)
 For the Birds (2000)
 Monsters, Inc. (2001)
 Star Wars: Episode II – Attack of the Clones (2002)
 Bayside Shakedown 2 (2003)
 Star Wars: Episode III – Revenge of the Sith (2005)
 Cars (2006)
 WALL-E (2008) – Best Sound
 Up (2009) – Best Sound Editing
 Toy Story 3 (2010) – Best Sound Editing
 009 Re:Cyborg (2012)
 Kong: Skull Island (2017)

References

External links

Year of birth missing (living people)
Living people
American audio engineers
Disney people
Pixar people
Lucasfilm people